Witness is the fifth studio album by American singer Katy Perry. It was released on June 9, 2017, by Capitol Records. For the album, Perry worked with numerous producers, including Jeff Bhasker, Mark Crew, Duke Dumont, Jack Garratt, Oscar Holter, Illangelo, Ilya, Max Martin, Ali Payami and Shellback. Witness is an electropop album that delves into dance and EDM genres, with lyrics on self empowerment and feminism. Perry described it as an album of "liberation" and "purposeful pop".

Five singles aided Witness, out of which, three were released before the album and one reached the top-ten of the Billboard Hot 100 chart: the lead single, "Chained to the Rhythm" featuring Skip Marley, peaked at number four on the Hot 100. "Bon Appétit" featuring Migos peaked at number 59, while "Swish Swish" featuring Nicki Minaj reached number 46. "Save as Draft" and "Hey Hey Hey" were released as subsequent singles on June 26, 2017 and January 12, 2018, respectively, with "Hey Hey Hey" receiving a music video. To support the album's release, Perry broadcast herself on a four-day YouTube live-stream, titled Katy Perry Live: Witness World Wide. Upon release, critics were divided towards the album, with some criticizing the production and lyricism while others praised the more personal aspect of the album and were favorable towards some "essential" tracks.

Moving 180,000 album equivalent units in its first-week, Witness debuted atop the US Billboard 200 chart, becoming Perry's third chart-topping album in the country. The album also topped the charts in Canada and Spain, while reaching number two in Australia, South Korea, Mexico, and New Zealand and the top five region in nine other territories. To promote the album, Perry embarked on her fourth concert tour, Witness: The Tour. Prior to the release of the album, Perry had not released new material in four years, with the exception of the 2016 Summer Olympics anthem, "Rise". After releasing Prism (2013) and touring in 2014–2015, Perry went on hiatus to protect her mental health and to return afresh. Perry decided to shed her on-stage persona and embrace her self-proclaimed authentic self as Katheryn Hudson, her real name. As a result, she retired her long, dark hair for a short pixie cut, and adopted her natural blonde hair color.

Development
Following the release of her fourth album Prism in 2013 and the end of the Prismatic World Tour in October 2015, Katy Perry told The New York Times in February 2016 that she was in the "research and development phase" of a new album. She decided to take a hiatus after the tour concluded to "give my mental health a break" before starting to write new songs the following June. Perry felt "refreshed" after the hiatus, and had over 40 tracks "in progress" before the year ended. In August, the singer stated that she aspired to make material "that connects and relates and inspires" and told Ryan Seacrest that she was "not rushing" her fifth album, adding "I'm just having a lot of fun, but experimenting and trying different producers, and different collaborators, and different styles." The album marked a departure from long time producer and co-writer Dr. Luke. In February 2017, Perry stated that the album was "definitely a new era for me" and "an era of purposeful pop" she was proud of. Later that month, she told Capital FM that "I've got something swirling, but I think I want to put out some songs first before I give them the full meal." The following May, Perry revealed to Entertainment Weekly that the album would include 15 of the 40 songs she wrote for it, and described the record as "fun and dance-y and dark and light."

Composition
Musically, Witness is an electropop album, containing influences of dance and EDM. As analyzed by Annie Zaleski from The A.V. Club, hooks are in short supply, replaced by grooves and atmosphere that pick and choose elements from 1990s house music, mainstream EDM, electro-tinged hip-hop, and 1980s new wave.

Witness opens with the title track, an electronic song backed by a 1990s house piano. "Hey Hey Hey" asserts that women can be complex people with a multitude of personality traits, as noted by Annie Zaleski from The A.V. Club, "Hey Hey Hey" depicts a narrow version of femininity and success and it perpetuates irksome stereotypes about strong women. "Roulette" is an EDM song described as "explosive" by Christopher R. Weingarten from Rolling Stone. "Swish Swish" runs throughout a house-influenced beat and contains a sample from "Star 69" by Fatboy Slim which itself samples "I Get Deep" by Roland Clark. "Déjà Vu" is "an electro-R&B ballad about wanting to free oneself from a dead-end relationship." "Power" is an electro composition, which explores a theme of self empowerment, Jillian Males from Pitchfork noted that the song "approximates feminism by politicizing a personal struggle for control."

Artwork
Commenting on the concept of the album cover, Perry said,
"Music has allowed me to travel, which has reeducated my mind and changed my perspective on so much, so my education and my consciousness comes from my voice, and that's how I see, and that's how I witness you and that's how you witness me and that's why the eye is in the mouth."
On September 29, 2017, Urban Outfitters released a limited-edition exclusive vinyl of the album with alternate cover art.

Billboards Tatiana Cirisano listed the album cover as one of the worst of 2017, characterizing its "freaky alien theme" as "just a tad too horrifying".

Promotion

In February 2017, Spotify announced that it would run a campaign to promote the album up to its release in the middle of the year. On May 15, Perry confirmed the album would be titled Witness and would be released through Capitol Records on June 9, 2017. She also announced that the concert tour supporting the album would be titled Witness: The Tour. It began in September 2017 and concluded in August 2018. Tickets purchased would include a copy of the album. The night before Witness came out, she hosted a live countdown for the record on her YouTube channel, which featured the singer performing and discussing tracks on the record as well as responding to fan questions. To accompany the album's release, Perry also broadcast herself on YouTube with a live-stream titled Katy Perry Live: Witness World Wide for four days, concluding with a live concert on June 12.

Singles
The album's lead single, "Chained to the Rhythm" featuring Skip Marley, was released on February 10, 2017. It went on to top the charts in Hungary while reaching number four in the United States. "Bon Appétit" with Migos followed as the second single on April 28, 2017. The track reached number 59 in the United States and number 14 in Canada. "Swish Swish", featuring Nicki Minaj, was released as the third single on May 19, 2017. The song peaked at number 46 in the United States, and number 13 in Canada. "Save as Draft" was released to American radio stations on June 26, 2017, and "Hey Hey Hey" was released in Italy as the album's fifth single on January 12, 2018.

Critical reception

Witness was met with mixed reception from music critics. At Metacritic, which assigns a normalized rating out of 100 to reviews from mainstream critics, the album received an average score of 53, based on 20 reviews, which indicates "mixed or average reviews".

Hannah J. Davies of The Guardian gave the album a rating of 4 out of 5 stars, writing that the singer "still has a flair for tunes that quickly seep into the collective consciousness" and praised "Swish Swish" as "a house-fuelled banger with undeniable groove," though felt that "Perry's heartfelt ballads feel tacked on in the face of all this weirdness." Leonie Cooper from NME gave it the same rating and noted that the album did not display any subtlety in the music, complimenting it for "[delivering] important messages about female autonomy to a young audience, it's surely better to shout than whisper." USA Todays Maeve McDermott commended the album for being "sonically coherent" and noted it as a personal record, rather than the politically charged marketing campaign it had received.

Idolator's Mike Wass gave Witness a score of 4 out of 5. He did not feel it had "introspection or maturity," though praised "Miss You More" as "the kind of brutally honest anthem that Katy isn't given enough credit for," and dubbed it "the album's emotional core." Wass concluded that "Witness might be overly ambitious and is definitely a couple of songs too long, but dance-pop experiments don't come much more enjoyable than this." Kevin O'Donnell of Entertainment Weekly gave it a B rating stating, "Perry is reflective, anxious, and fired up on Witness," highlighting "Déjà Vu" and "Swish Swish" as the best tracks.

Wren Graves from Consequence of Sound gave the album a rating of C. He listed "Swish Swish", "Power", and "Déjà Vu" as essential tracks, but felt that most of the other songs were more of a "filler," and that a lack of cohesiveness with Perry's output made Witness inferior to her previous material. Giving Witness 3 out of 5 stars, Christopher R. Weingarten wrote in Rolling Stone that it was comparable to the music of Halsey and Camila Cabello, and that the songs blended "into the rest of the radio." He also did not like how Perry's voice was "devoured in effects and reverb."

Sal Cinquemani gave the same score, praising the empowerment themes within "Hey Hey Hey" and "Power", though ultimately felt that the record "lacks both the big hooks that propelled Perry's past hits up the charts and the conceptual and sonic focus to give her pop real purpose." AllMusic's Stephen Thomas Erlewine gave the album 2 out of 5 stars, saying it felt "relentless and a shade desperate" and called the record "a conceptual muddle." He added that Witness "erodes whatever adult contemporary progress Perry made with Prism." The Daily Telegraph journalist Neil McCormick gave Witness the same rating, and panned the usage of the term "purposeful pop" for the songs. He found Witness to be musically repetitive, explaining that within the multitude of people working on the record, Perry's "individual talent" was lost making "Witness [sound like] someone trying to cover too many bases."

Writing for The Independent, Andy Gill also rated the record 2 out of 5 stars. He criticized the production of the tracks, especially the ones by Max Martin, describing them as "identical to everyone else's." Mikael Wood from the Los Angeles Times shared a similar view in his analysis of the album. Wood was critical of the musical direction on Witness, the supposed "purposeful pop" being lost in the tracks and Perry's singing. He listed "Chained to the Rhythm" and "Swish Swish" as highlights. According to Jordan Sargent from Spin, the record "feels like it's making a bid for a level of artistic seriousness—a recognition of aesthetic vision—that Perry has never really been afforded." He felt that it indicated her "artillery of undeniable pop songs" had been "all but depleted." Variety writer Chris Willman did not feel album was "the kind of obvious smash to which all of America would plainly say: Baby, you're a firework," but asserted it "counts at least as a sparkler — the kind you hold in your hand for 45 seconds in the summer, if not the enduring."

Accolades

Commercial performance
In the United States, Witness debuted at number one on the Billboard 200 with 180,000 album-equivalent units, which included 162,000 pure album sales. It became Perry's third album to the top the country's chart after Teenage Dream (2010) and Prism (2013) both debuted at number one. The record had the highest opening in the US for a female since Lady Gaga's Joanne in 2016 and became the second album by a female artist from 2017, after Halsey's Hopeless Fountain Kingdom, to open atop the chart. Witness dropped to number 13 on the Billboard 200 the following week, earning 28,000 album-equivalent units and selling 18,000 copies. According to Billboard, it was the country's eighth-highest performing album of the 2017 summer season, earning 431,000 album-equivalent units in the nation by September 2017. It has sold 311,000 copies there as of August 2020. Witness also became Perry's third album after Teenage Dream and Prism to open at number one on the Canadian Albums Chart, selling 23,000 units in its first week. The record subsequently descended to number four one week later. That November, it received a Platinum certification from Music Canada (MC). The album additionally entered at number one in Spain, and fell to number 13 in its second week.

In New Zealand, Witness entered the albums chart at number two. In Australia, it also debuted at number two on the ARIA Albums Chart with opening sales of 5,794 copies. Selling another 2,069 the following week, it reached a total of 7,863 copies sold within the nation. The record has since been certified Gold by the Australian Recording Industry Association (ARIA). In Japan, the album opened at number 22 on the Oricon Albums Chart, and moved up to number 19 the next week. In the United Kingdom, Witness debuted at number 6 on the UK Albums Chart, where it became Perry's third top 10 album, following Teenage Dream and Prism. According to the Official Charts Company, it opened with 16,153 album-equivalent units in the nation. As of January 2018, Witness has sold more than 840,000 copies worldwide.

Track listing

Notes
  – main and vocal producer
  – main and additional vocal producer
  – additional producer
  – vocal producer
  – additional vocal producer

Sample credits
 "Swish Swish" contains excerpts from "I Get Deep" written by Roland Clark.
 "Power" contains a sample of "Being with You" written and performed by Smokey Robinson.

Personnel
Adapted from the album liner notes.

 Nelson Beato – gospel studio choir (track 14)
 Jeff Bhasker – producer, keyboards and drums programming (track 14)
 Cory Bice – assistant engineer (tracks 1, 2, 3, 9, 11); engineer (track 17)
 Edie Lehmann Boddicker – vocal contracting, gospel choir conducting, gospel studio choir (track 14)
 Alexandra Brown – gospel studio choir (track 14)
 Denise Carite – gospel studio choir (track 14)
 Charlean Carmon – gospel studio choir (track 14)
 Carmen Carter – gospel studio choir (track 14)
 Tom Coyne – mastering (track 9)
 Mark Crew – production, keyboards, programming (track 17)
 Aubry Delaine – additional engineering, Nicki Minaj vocal recording (track 4)
 Francesco Donadello – engineer (track 15)
 Monique Donnelly – gospel studio choir (track 14)
 Duke Dumont – producer, synths, drums, programming (track 4)
 Carmel Echols – gospel studio choir (track 14)
 Luke Edgemon – gospel studio choir (track 14)
 Anthony Evans – gospel studio choir (track 14)
 Rationale – electric guitar, bass, programming (track 17)
 Iain Findlay – vocal assistant engineering (Nicki Minaj's vocals, track 4)
 Rachael Findlen – engineer (tracks 4, 5, 6, 7, 8, 10, 14-17); vocal production (tracks: 7, 8)
 Nicole Franz – art direction
 Sia – background vocals (track 9)
 Jack Garratt – production, all instruments (track 6)
 James Alan Ghaleb – guitar (track 9)
 Serban Ghenea – mixing
 Jim Gilstrap – gospel studio choir (track 14)
 Lauren Gluckman – A&R
 John Hanes – mixing engineer
 Sam Holland – engineer (track 1, 3, 9, 11, 17)
 Oscar Holter – keys (track 11, 12); production, vocal production, programming (track 12)
 Casey Hooper – guitars (track 10)
 Stephen Hybicki – engineer (track 10)
 Illangelo – additional production, additional drum programming (track 14)
 Ilya – production, programming, arranging, drums, percussion, guitars, bass, keys (track 17)
 Clydene Jackson – gospel studio choir (track 14)
 Hayden James – production; guitar, bass, background vocals, synths (track 5)
 Peter Karlsson – vocal editing (tracks 1, 2, 3, 9, 11, 14); additional vocal production (track 8); percussion (track 9)
 Briana Lee – gospel studio choir (track 14)
 Jeremy Lertola – assistant engineer (tracks: 1, 2, 3, 9, 11); engineer (track 17)
 David Loucks – gospel studio choir (track 14)
 Elof Loelv – production, engineer, programming, drums, bass, piano, synthesizers (track 14)
 Ted Lovett – layout
 Skip Marley – featured vocals, background vocals (track 9)
 Max Martin – background vocals, programming, Prophet 6, solina (track 9), percussion; acoustic guitar (track 8); vocal production (tracks: 8, 13), executive producer
 Migos – featured vocals (track 11)
 Jamie McCrary – gospel studio choir (track 14)
 Randy Merrill – mastering
 Zeke Mishanec – assistant engineer (track 4)
 Ryan Nasci – engineer (track 14)
 Dustin O'Halloran – producer, all instruments, arrangement (track 15)
 Pino Palldino – bass (track 14)
 Noah Passovoy – additional keys, programming (track 4, 10); engineer (tracks 4, 6, 10, 14, 16, 17), vocal production (tracks 5, 6, 10, 14, 16, 17); vocal editing (track 7, 12); additional production (tracks 4, 10); percussion (track 10)
 Ali Payami – acoustic guitar (track 1); drums, bass, synths, piano (tracks 1, 8, 9); additional vocal production, programming, keys, electric guitar, background vocals, production (track 8); percussion (tracks 8, 9); hand claps (track 9)
 Louis Price – gospel studio choir (track 14)
 Katy Perry – background vocals (tracks 3, 9), vocals, executive producer
 Daryl McPherson – Migos vocal production
 Joshua Moreau – bass (track 10)
 Corin Roddick – production, vocal production (track 12)
 David Rudnick – front and back cover art direction
 Scooly – production (track 10)
 Aretha Scruggs – gospel studio choir (track 14)
 Tony Scruggs – gospel studio choir (track 14)
 Shellback – production; background vocals (track 3); keys, programming (track 11)
 PJ Sledge – keyboards (track 4)
 Felix Snow – production, vocal manipulations, programming, guitar (track 16)
 Thomas Stell – synths (track 5)
 Carmen Twillie – gospel studio choir (track 14)
 Oren Waters – gospel studio choir (track 14)
 Will Wheaton – gospel studio choir (track 14)
 Mike Will Made It – production (track 10)
 Eyvonne Williams – gospel studio choir (track 14)
 Brandon Winbush – gospel studio choir (track 14)
 Jason Woods – gospel studio choir (track 14)

Charts

Weekly charts

Monthly charts

Year-end charts

Certifications and sales

Release history

See also
 List of Billboard 200 number-one albums of 2017
 List of number-one albums of 2017 (Canada)
 List of number-one albums of 2017 (Spain)

References

2017 albums
Albums produced by DJ Mustard
Albums produced by Jeff Bhasker
Albums produced by Max Martin
Albums produced by Mike Will Made It
Albums produced by Shellback (record producer)
Albums produced by Ilya Salmanzadeh
Albums produced by Illangelo
Capitol Records albums
Katy Perry albums
Electropop albums